Kavindapadi, also known as Kavundapadi, is located in Erode District of Tamil Nadu, India which is one of the major producers of sugar in India.  It is also famous for its agriculture, producing the lump sum amount of sugarcane and bananas to the people of Tamil Nadu. Kavindapadi is located on the way of Erode to Sathyamangalam.

Kavindapadi can be easily identified with Four Roads Junction on the way to Sathy from Erode. In the three road junction we have bus stand.  Nearest villages like Bommanpatti, Velampalayam, Nalligoundanoor, Chinna kavundanur , pappankatoor , Poomandagoundanur, Ayyampalayam, Perunthalaiyur, P.Mettupalyam, K.Pudur, Pandianpalayam, Kolathuppalayam, Vellankovil, Kucharamadai, Singanullur, Paaraikaattuvalasu, Kannadipudhu,  Siruvallur, Periyapuliyur, Appakoodal, Salangapalayam, Senthampalayam are famous for agricultural and hand-loom products.

The few more notable things about Kavindapadi is the  massive sugar provider to Palani Murugar Temple for preparing the famous panjamirtham. And it's having massive sugar storage area and sugar market, weekly market and Vijayan Theater, Valarmathi Theater, Bava thirumana mahal, Kavin Mahal , Laxsmi Mahal, Sakthi Mahal, Thangam Mahal,Mariamman temple festival (every year in March), Kaaliamman temple festival (every year in December).  Kavindapadi has weekly market on Wednesday opposite to police station.  It is one of the biggest markets in the district.  It gives opportunity for surrounding people to buy/sell products at an affordable cost. KVP is mid-place for Bhavani, Gobi, Perundurai, Erode. It serves origin point to all these 4 places. It is also known for its sugarcane plantation in and around kavindapadi.

Kavindapadi handloom clothes

Annai Indira Gandhi Handloom Weavers Cooperative Production and Sales society at Kaunthappadi and  E.H.210 Sri Mariamman Mahalir
Weavers Cooperative Society Ltd.
and some more societies  are involved in production of Handloom door mat. These are especially known as "Erode handloom door mat". and also Kaunthappadi handloom weavers produce and sell handloom clothes through the Co-operative Production and Marketing Association.

Tamil Nadu is located in downsouth of Indian Union territory. Erode is one of the districts of Tamil Nadu.

Agricultural activities plays a major role in Tamil Nadu. Next to agriculture, weaving culture plays a major role economically, commercially and culturally.

Handloom weavers living in Tamil Nadu make handloom sarees, handloom dhotis, handloom jamakkalam, handloom bedsheets and handloom door mats.

Weavers produce handloom footwear through a women's organization in the Dukkanayakkanpalayam and Kempanayakkanpalayam areas at the foothills of the Western Ghats.

Weavers living in Kizhvani area under Bhavani circle participate in production and sales activities through Kizhvani handloom production and sales association.

Neighborhoods
 Kanjikoil
 Gobichettipalayam
 Chithode
 Perundurai
 Nasiyanur
 Thingalur
 Lakshmi Nagar
 Komarapalayam
 Erode
 Bhavani
 Sathyamangalam
 Kolappalur
 Nambiyur
 Kunnathur
 Avinashi
 Perumanallur
 Chengapalli
 Vijayamangalam
 Tiruppur
 Othakudirai

Bus Terminus
 Kavindapadi has a Bus stand which link more parts of Erode district and other neighbouring districts. Some of them are as follows :
Erode Bus Terminus, Erode railway junction, Kanjikoil, Perundurai, Gobichettipalayam, Sathyamangalam, Chithode, Nasiyanur, Thingalur, Othakudirai, Vijayamangalam, Chennimalai, Ingur, Vadamugam Vellode, Arachalur, Bhavani, Kumarapalayam, Lakshmi Nagar, Avalpoondurai, Kangeyam, Kolappalur, Kunnathur, Perumalmalai, Thudupathi, SIPCOT Perundurai, Uthukuli, Tiruppur, Anthiyur, Paruvatchi, Jambai, Appakudal,Mettur,Dharmapuri,Krishnagiri, Hosur,Namakkal, Salem, Bannari, Mysore,Trichy,Tanjore,Kumbakonam,Madurai,Marthandam,Nagarkovil.

Schools
 Govt Boys Higher Secondary School (http://www.icbse.com/schools/gbhss-kavindapadi/33100301712)
 Govt Girls Higher Secondary School (http://www.icbse.com/schools/gghss-kavindapadi/33100301705)
 Govt Primary school (North) 
 Govt Primary school (South) 
 Saraswathi Vidyalaya Matriculation School
 Honey Buds  ( Kindergarten) 
 TNK Matriculation and Higher Secondary School
 Kalaimakal Kalvi nilayam
 Senthil Typewriting & Computer Center
 i-tech computers, PMKVY Training Center

Colleges
Sri Venketaswara Engineering college, Othakkuthirai
EIT Polytechnic College is located 3 km away from Kavindapadi.
Computer Software College (CSC), 225, Near Bus Stand, Kavindapadi-638455.
Adharsh Vidhyalaya College Of Education, address: Adharsh Nagar A; Paruvachi Post; Bhavani; Erode—638 312.
Aishwarya Polytechnic College, address: Errattaikaradu; Paruvachi Post; Bhavni (tk); Erode—638 312.
Best College Of Education, Address: No 5/86; Sevakoundanur Periya Puliyur; Bhavani Main Rd; Erode—638455
Bhavani Polytechnic College, address: Mettur Main Rd; Varadhanallur; Bhavani (tk); Erode—638 311.
Adharsh Vidyalaya College Of Arts And Science For Women, address: Adharsh Nagar A; Paruvachi Village; Bhavani (tk) Erode Dist.
Inspire Info Tech (IIT), Near Bus Stand, Kavindapadi.
Trendy Designers, (All kind of designs and software developments), address: ACS Nilayam, Near State Bank, Kavundapadi.

Hotels & Restaurants
Kavindapadi consists of a handful of hotels which are mostly located in and around the 4 road junction.

Totally, 2 - Kalan kadai's, 25 - foods shop's &

27 backery's are in and around Kavindapadi.

Famous hotel's are listed below :-

Thara mess - avail veg & non-veg (cost effective)

Harini Family Restaurant - avil veg & non-veg (bitcostly)

Muniyandi Vilas - avail veg & non-veg (cost effective)

Chennai fast food - avil veg & non-veg (cost effective)

Kumar mess - only parrotas ( famous parrota shop)

Selvi mess - avail veg & non-veg 

Radha mess - avail veg & non-veg ( bit costly not worthy)

Saravana Bhavan - veg ( delicious foods avail)

Jaya cafe - veg ( famous for masal dosa )

Bishmi briyani kadai - famous for briyani & chilly

K R briyani kadai - getting famous now 

Kavunthi's kitchen - all foods avail at decent cost 

CSK boys fast food - all fast food varieties are avail

Babu fast food - foot starting from rs.20 

S.P fast food - good quality meals & fast foods avail 

Friends fast food - avail Veg & non-veg fast foods 

Appatha idly kadai - avail tiffin items 

Night tiffen centre - avail paniyaram & idly only 

Selvi restaurant - near bus stand all food avail.

Banks
Most public and private banks have branches in Kavundapadi. The majority include

 TamilNadu Grama Bank
 SBI Bank-Gobichettipalayam Road
 Canara Bank kavandapadi branch
 Karur Vysya Bank-Erode Road
 Indian Overseas Bank Erode Road [Opp. to KVB]
 Kavindapadi Co-operative Bank, Appakoodal Road..
 Tamil Nadu Merchantile Bank, Dharmaapuri

Weekly Sugar Market
It is a weekly market in Kavindapdi on the way to Gobi, which is located around 2 km from Bus Stand towards Gobi. Market is available only on every Saturday in a week starts at 9.30 AM to 11 AM IST.
The Market consists of around 60+ Godowns, each godown can store more than 5 Tonnes of Jaggery.

References

External links
 

Villages in Erode district